Getting Gertie's Garter may refer to:
 Getting Gertie's Garter (1945 film), an American slapstick comedy film based on the play
 Getting Gertie's Garter (1927 film), an American silent comedy film based on the play
 Getting Gertie's Garter (play), a play written by Wilson Collison and Avery Hopwood